"Remember That" is a song by South Korean boy band BtoB from their eighth extended play of the same name. It was released a day early of the EP's release, accompanied with its official music video.

Cube Entertainment began releasing teasers of the members by March 2016.
The song was an all-in-all success and had earned them their first win in Show Champion and other music shows since their debut. Weighed cumulative sales of the song was around 241, 733+ according to Gaon Music Chart.

Track listing

Chart performance

References

Cube Entertainment singles
2016 singles
2016 songs
Korean-language songs
BtoB songs